The 2019 Galway Senior Football Championship is the 124th edition of Galway GAA's premier Gaelic football tournament for senior graded clubs in County Galway, Ireland. The winners receive the Frank Fox Cup and represent Galway in the Connacht Senior Club Football Championship.

Eighteen teams compete. This year there will be a new format once again. With the previous years 4 semi finalists being seeded and separated into 3 groups of 6(With one group having 2 seeded teams)

Corofin were the defending champions after they defeated Mountbellew/Moylough in the 2018 final.

This was An Spidéal's return the senior grade for the first time in 13 seasons (since their relegation from the S.F.C. in 2006) after they claimed to 2018 I.F.C. title.

Team changes
The following teams have changed division since the 2018 championship season.

To S.F.C.
Promoted from 2018 Galway Intermediate Football Championship
 An Spidéal  -  (Intermediate Champions)

From S.F.C.
Relegated to 2019 Galway Intermediate Football Championship
 Caltra
 Cortoon Shamrocks
 Kilconly

Format

Group stage
2019 brings about a new format for the competition where there is 3 groups of 6 teams.
The 2018 Semi-finalists, Corofin, Mountbellew/Moylough, Annaghdown and Salthill/Knocknacarra will be Seeded and placed in each Group, with one group having two seeded teams. The remaining group places made up from the remaining 14 teams in an open draw. 

If teams are level on points, the first deciding factor will be the head-to-head result between the sides; the second will be the points difference; and the third will be the scoring average.

Knockout stage

Relegation playoff

Group stages

Group 1

Round 1

Round 2

Round 3

Round 4

Round 5

Group 2

Round 1

Round 2

Round 3

Round 4

Round 5

Group 3

Round 1

Round 2

Round 3

Round 4

Round 5

Knockout stage

Quarter-finals
QF 1

QF 2

QF 3

QF 4

Semi-finals
Semi-final 1

Semi-final 2

Final

Final - Replay

Relegation playoffs

Format
This year, two teams will be relegated.
The bottom two teams in each group will playoff, with the winner retaining Senior status, and the loser moving into a round robin group.
The bottom two team in the round robin group will be relegated

Playoff Games

Relegation Group stage
The bottom two teams in the table will be relegated.

Relegation Group

Game 1

Game 2

Game 3

References

External links

Galway Senior Football Championship
Galway Senior Football Championship
Galway SFC